Andre Resampa  (June 24, 1924 - May 17, 1993) was a Malagasy politician who was the influential Interior Minister of Madagascar at the beginning of the independence in 1960, and appointed as 1st Vice President of Madagascar from October 1970 until February 1971.

Biography 
Born on June 24, 1924, in Mandabe (Mahabo District), He went to Mandabe's primary school then to the regional school of Morondava. He attended courses at the Administrative Section of Ecole Le Myre de vilers where he graduated. He then entered the Administration as a Writer-Interpret and changed his way to Judicial Services and became Court Secretary. He earned a Law Certificate and was named Director of Court Secretaries.

Political career 
Recipient of six honors, he was elected member of the Tulear's Provincial Assembly in 1952, and was reelected in 1957. That same year, he was designated to become Parliament Representative, then elected member of the National Assembly in October 1958. Meanwhile, he had been elected member of the Government Counsel on May 27, 1957, as the Education Minister and later on Social Affairs. Nominated in May 1959, as Interior Minister, he kept his mandate after the October 10, 1960's Constitution of the Government became effective.

References

1924 births
Malagasy politicians
1993 deaths
Social Democratic Party of Madagascar politicians
People from Menabe
Vice presidents of Madagascar
Agriculture ministers of Madagascar
Education ministers of Madagascar
Interior ministers of Madagascar
Social affairs ministers of Madagascar
Youth ministers of Madagascar